Adria Cathedral (or the New Cathedral) is a Roman Catholic cathedral in the city of Adria, in the province of Rovigo and the region of Veneto, Italy. Formerly the episcopal seat of the Diocese of Adria, it has been since 1986 that of the Diocese of Adria-Rovigo.

The present cathedral replaces the much older former cathedral nearby, dedicated to Saint John, the Old Cathedral (Cattedrale Vecchia, Chiesa di San Giovanni), which continues in use as a parish church.

The new cathedral, dedicated to Saints Peter and Paul, was built in the early 19th century over a 14th-century church. When works were undertaken in 1830 to investigate the stability of the foundations, a Byzantine crypt and frescoes were discovered.

The cathedral also contains a Byzantine bas relief of the 6th century, a Byzantine altar and crucifix, and in the sacristy some magnificently carved cupboards by Giacomo Piazzetta from the Charity School of Venice.

Behind the building a replica of the Grotto of Lourdes was constructed in the 1930s, which still attracts many visitors.

Sources and external links
 Adria Cathedral official website  
 Diocese of Adria-Rovigo: official website 
 Catholic Encyclopedia: Adria
 Catholic Hierarchy: Dioccese of Adria-Rovigo

 

Roman Catholic cathedrals in Italy
Cathedrals in Veneto
Churches in the province of Rovigo
19th-century Roman Catholic church buildings in Italy